Miller Township is an inactive township in Phelps County, in the U.S. state of Missouri.

Miller Township has the name of Hamilton Miller, a local jurist.

References

Townships in Missouri
Townships in Phelps County, Missouri